Craven Terrace is a historic apartment complex located at New Bern, Craven County, North Carolina. The complex was built in two stages in 1942 and 1953, and consists of 46 apartment buildings, a one-story brick community building (1942).  The buildings include elements of Colonial Revival and Moderne style design elements. The complex was built as a low-income residential development for African American residents of New Bern and was funded by the United States Housing Authority.

It was listed on the National Register of Historic Places in 2014.

References 

Public housing in the United States
African-American history of North Carolina
Residential buildings on the National Register of Historic Places in North Carolina
Colonial Revival architecture in North Carolina
Residential buildings completed in 1953
Buildings and structures in Craven County, North Carolina
National Register of Historic Places in Craven County, North Carolina